Numerous ships have sailed under the name Antelope. Notable ones include:

 , a packet ship launched in 1780, most famous for a desperate single-ship action in 1793 in which she captured a much larger French privateer
 , a packet ship built for the British East India Company (EIC) in 1781 that made one voyage that ended when she was wrecked in 1783 off Ulong, and that resulted in the first sustained European contact with Palau
  was built at Batavia in 1792 and captured in 1797. She sailed from London on 20 May 1798 to gather slaves from Africa. She embarked slaves at Anomabu, and later was reported off Grenada on her way to Jamaica. Her subsequent fate is currently unknown.
  was a French vessel launched in 1795 and captured circa 1798. She sailed primarily as a West Indiaman until circa 1804 when Daniel Bennett purchased her and sent her out as a privateer operating off South America, first in the Atlantic and then the Pacific. A Spanish armed merchantman captured her in 1806, killing her master.
 Antelope was a brig of 188 tons (bm), launched in America in 1795. In the 1800s, she traded between Cowes and Dunkirk. Lloyd's List reported on 28 December 1804 that Antelope, Curran, master, from Virginia to Dunkirk, was upset at Calais. Her crew was saved and the cargo was expected to be saved. The registers carried stale information for some years thereafter.
  was a slave ship whose capture in 1820 gave rise to a notable legal case concerning the United States of America's slave trade.
  was a brig built at Nantes in 1805 that the British captured c. 1807 and that new owners renamed. She traded for three or four years until in 1811 the British East India Company chartered her to carry despatches to India. She then remained there.
Antelope (1841 brig) was a brig of 370 tons, built in East Boston by Samuel Hall for Russel & Co.
 (1851 ship) was a clipper ship launched in 1851 and wrecked in 1858
 Antelope (shipwreck) was a cargo steamship launched in 1861 that sank in Lake Superior in 1897
  was a steamboat that operated on the southern Oregon coast from 1886 to about 1908
  was built as Ophis in 1919, renamed Empire Antelope in 1941, and sunk in November 1942

Naval vessels
 , a brig of 199 tons (bm), and 12-14 guns, was launched at Bombay Dockyard for the Bombay Marine, the British East India Company's naval arm. She was sold after 1830.
 , one of 10 vessels that have served the Royal Navy
 , one of three vessels that have served the United States Navy

Citations

Ship names